Burmese pronouns are words in the Burmese language used to address or refer to people or things.

Subject pronouns begin sentences, though the subject is generally omitted in the imperative forms and in conversation. Grammatically speaking, subject marker particles ( ( in colloquial,   in formal) must be attached to the subject pronoun, although they are also generally omitted in conversation. Object pronouns must have an object marker particle (  in colloquial,   in formal) attached immediately after the pronoun. Proper nouns are often substituted for pronouns, an example of pronoun avoidance. One's status in relation to the audience determines the pronouns used, with certain pronouns used for different audiences.

Personal pronouns
Polite pronouns are used to address elders, teachers and strangers, through the use of feudal-era third person pronouns in lieu of first and second person pronouns. So ingrained are these terms in the daily polite speech that people use them as the first and second person pronouns without giving a second thought to the root meaning of these pronouns.

Basic personal pronouns
Basic pronouns can be pluralized by suffixing the following particles to the pronoun:  (tui.) or colloquial  (dui.).

Religious personal pronouns
Other pronouns are reserved for speaking with Buddhist monks. When speaking to a monk, the following pronouns are used:

† The particle ma. is suffixed for females.
‡ Typically reserved for the chief monk of a monastery.

Contraction pronunciation rule
In colloquial Burmese, possessive pronouns are contracted when the root pronoun itself is low toned. Examples include the following:
 ( "I") +  (postpositional marker for possessive case) =  ( "my")
 ( "you") +  (postpositional marker for possessive case) =  ( "your")
 ( "he, she") +  (postpositional marker for possessive case) =  ( "his, her")

Demonstrative pronouns
Demonstrative pronouns in Myanmar are same in nature with English. Demonstrative pronouns are identical with the demonstrative adjectives, but demonstrative pronouns stand alone, while demonstrative adjectives qualify a noun.
	
The most common demonstrative pronouns in Myanmar are  "this",  "that", း "it". They are usually used for referring inanimate objects. These pronouns mostly used with noun or noun phrases. Demonstrative pronouns have the form (pronoun + noun phrase) to demonstrate the previous object. For example,  "Mg Thit Lwin was born in Phakant Town."  "That Town is also called 'Jade Land'". In the above example sentence, the demonstrative pronoun  "that" is used with the noun  "town" to refer the  "Phakant township".

Reflexive pronouns
Burmese has two alternative forms of the reflexive:
spoken form: , used with direct objects and with pronouns (i.e.,  'himself' or  'oneself')

Notes

References
 

Burmese words and phrases
Pronouns by language